Laga, officially Laga Administrative Post, is an administrative post (and was formerly a subdistrict) in Baucau municipality, East Timor. Its seat or administrative centre is Soba. Its population in 2010 was 14,000.

References

External links 

  – information page on Ministry of State Administration site 

Administrative posts of East Timor
Baucau Municipality